MV Princess Victoria was the first British stern-loading cross-channel car ferry.  After two months it was requisitioned by the Admiralty and converted to a Minelayer.  It was sunk by a mine on 19 May 1940.

Construction
The ship was built as a purpose built car and passenger ferry by William Denny & Bros of Dumbarton, Scotland for the London Midland and Scottish Railway.  She is understood to have been the first stern loading cross-channel car ferry with a capacity variously quoted at between 24/64/80 cars and with two  turntables to assist loading and unloading.  Passengers and livestock could be loaded via sidedoors.

The ship and special berthing facilities at Larne and Stranraer cost nearly £200,000.

Service
The ship way allocated to the Stranraer - Larne route and entered service on 8 July 1939.

In September 1939, after just two months service, Princess Victoria was requisitioned and converted to an auxiliary minelayer. She was commissioned as HMS Princess Victoria and given the pennant number M03. She had a capacity of 244 mines. During her short service she laid 2756 mines.

Fate
After laying a minefield off the Dutch coast she struck a mine on the voyage home at the entrance to the Humber Estuary on 19 May 1940 and sank with 36 crew lost and 85 rescued.

Successor
Following the Second World War it was replaced by a near identical ship of the same name built in 1946 which was to sink in 1953.

References

Ferries of Scotland
Ferries of Northern Ireland
Ships of the London, Midland and Scottish Railway
1939 ships
Ships sunk by mines
Maritime incidents in May 1940